The Circuit Value Problem (or Circuit Evaluation Problem) is the computational problem of computing the output of a given Boolean circuit on a given input.

The problem is complete for P under uniform AC reductions. Note that, in terms of time complexity, it can be solved in linear time simply by a topological sort.

The Boolean Formula Value Problem (or Boolean Formula Evaluation Problem) is the special case of the problem when the circuit is a tree. The Boolean Formula Value Problem is complete for NC.

The problem is closely related to the Boolean Satisfiability Problem which is complete for NP and its complement, the Propositional Tautology Problem, which is complete for co-NP.

See also 

 Circuit satisfiability
 Switching lemma

References

Polynomial-time problems
Computational problems
Theoretical computer science